Lamin Charty (born 8 April 1996) is a Gambian international footballer who plays for AS Douanes, as a midfielder.

Career
Born in Busumbala, he has played club football for Banjul Hawks and AS Douanes.

He made his international debut for Gambia in 2015.

References

1996 births
Living people
Gambian footballers
The Gambia international footballers
Banjul Hawks FC players
AS Douanes (Senegal) players
Association football midfielders
Gambian expatriate footballers
Expatriate footballers in Senegal
Gambian expatriate sportspeople in Senegal